Hallet Ara is a Syrian village in the Jableh District in Latakia Governorate. According to the Syria Central Bureau of Statistics (CBS), Hallet Ara had a population of 1,015 in the 2004 census.

Notable people
Ali Haydar, the commander of the Syrian Special Forces for 26 years.

References

Alawite communities in Syria
Populated places in Jableh District